The Peugeot Type 5 was a small car by Peugeot, produced from 1893 to 1896.  Mechanically, little was changed from the Peugeot Type 3.  The engine and most of the mechanical parts were unchanged, but the car was shorter, lighter, and correspondingly made more of its 2 horsepower.  However, against larger models from Peugeot, this car did not fare well.  A total of 14 were sold.

A motor racing first

The 1894 Paris–Rouen "contest for horseless carriages" organised by Le Petit Journal. Albert Lemaître, driving the 3 hp Peugeot (No.65), was the first petrol (gasoline) engined finisher. Five Peugeots reached the finish at Rouen - Albert Lemaître, Auguste Doriot, Émile Kraeutler, "Michaud", and Louis Rigoulot. "Les fils de Peugeot Frères" were judged to have won the first prize, the 5,000 franc Prix du Petit Journal, which they shared equally with Panhard et Levassor.

Notes

References
Peugeot Car Models 1889-1909
Peugeot Type 5 at Histomobile

1890s cars
Type 5
Rear-engined vehicles
Vehicles introduced in 1893